Jacqueline Anne Petrusma (née Harper; born 23 March 1966) is an Australian politician. She was a Liberal Party of Australia member of the Tasmanian House of Assembly from 2010 to 2022, representing the electorate of Franklin, and served as a minister in the governments of Will Hodgman, Peter Gutwein and Jeremy Rockliff.

The daughter of Barry Harper, a former state cricketer, she was born in Launceston, Tasmania, and worked as a registered nurse before becoming involved in politics.  She is married to a nephew of former MLC Hank Petrusma.

Petrusma was educated at Glen Dhu Primary School, Kings Meadows High School, Launceston College and the University of Tasmania, where she graduated with a Bachelor of Commerce (Marketing) in 1995. She has one child from her first marriage, has three children from her second. She stood for the Senate in the 2004 federal election as a Family First Party candidate, coming close to defeating the Greens' Christine Milne on preferences. She contested the Senate again for the party at the 2007 election, but was unsuccessful. In 2009, she became a member of the Liberal Party and was endorsed as a candidate for Franklin at the 2010 state election, defeating Clarence City Councillor Tony Mulder for the second Liberal seat.

She became Minister for Human Services and Minister for Women in the Hodgman Ministry when the Liberal Party won government in March 2014, and Minister for Sport and Recreation, Minister for Disability Services and Community Development, Minister for Aboriginal Affairs and again Minister for Women after the March 2018 election and served in this capacity until resigning from these portfolios in July 2019 due to ongoing health issues with a cochlear implant.  Petrusma later became Deputy Speaker of the Parliament of Tasmania and Chairman of Committees.

In August 2019, Petrusma was granted the right to use the title "Honourable" for life.

Petrusma was reappointed to the cabinet following the 2021 state election. She was appointed Minister for Parks, Minister for Police, Fire and Emergency Management and Minister for the Prevention of Family Violence.

She resigned from the ministry and from parliament on 25 July 2022, citing family reasons.

References

|-

1966 births
Living people
Members of the Tasmanian House of Assembly
Liberal Party of Australia members of the Parliament of Tasmania
Australian nurses
University of Tasmania alumni
Politicians from Launceston, Tasmania
Family First Party politicians
Australian women nurses
21st-century Australian politicians
21st-century Australian women politicians
Women members of the Tasmanian House of Assembly